Ariel may refer to:

Film and television
Ariel Award, a Mexican Academy of Film award
Ariel (film), a 1988 Finnish film by Aki Kaurismäki
ARIEL Visual and ARIEL Deluxe, 1989 and 1991 anime video series based on the novel series by Yūichi Sasamoto
"Ariel" (Firefly episode) (2002)
"Ariel" (Once Upon a Time), a 2013 episode of Once Upon a Time
Ariel (The Little Mermaid), a red-haired mermaid who is fascinated by life on dry land and falls in love with Prince Eric in the 1989 Disney film The Little Mermaid
Ariel, a planet visited in an episode of Space: 1999

Literature
"Ariel" (poem), a 1965 poem by Sylvia Plath
Ariel (poetry collection), a 1965 collection of poetry by Sylvia Plath containing the eponymous poem
T. S. Eliot's Ariel poems, a series of poems by T. S. Eliot
Ariel (novel), a 1941 science fiction novel by Alexander Beliaev
Ariel (novel series), a 1986 science fiction novel series by Yūichi Sasamoto
Ariel (essay), a 1900 work by José Enrique Rodó
Ariel, a 1923 biography of Shelley by André Maurois
Ariel, a 1983 post-apocalyptic fantasy by Steve Boyett
 Ariel (The Tempest), a character in play by William Shakespeare

Journals and magazines
Ariel (newspaper), the in-house magazine of the BBC
Ariel: The Book of Fantasy, a periodical published in the 1970s in book form
Ariel (campus newspaper), a former campus newspaper at the University of Minnesota
Ariel, a comedic newspaper by Israel Zangwill

Music

Bands
Ariel (Australian band)
Ariel (Russian band)

Albums
Ariels (album), a 2004 album by Bent
Ariel, an EP by Alpha

Songs
"Ariel" (song), a 1977 song by Dean Friedman
"Ariel", a song by Anathema from Distant Satellites
"Ariel", a song by Babes in Toyland from Nemesisters
"Ariel", a song by Diane Birch from Bible Belt
"Ariel", a song by Braid from Frame & Canvas
"Ariel", a song by the Cure from The Top
"Ariel", a song by Rainbow from Stranger in Us All

Classical
Ariel, a 1971 vocal work by Ned Rorem
Ariel Fantasy, a 2001 work for solo instrument and piano by Paul Moravec
Ariel, a ballet by Roberto Gerhard

Places
Ariel (moon), a moon of Uranus
Ariel (city), an Israeli settlement and city in the central West Bank
Lake Ariel, Pennsylvania
Ariel, Washington

Transport

Aircraft 
Sud-Ouest Ariel, a light helicopter built in France

Cars and motorbikes
Ariel (American automobile)
Ariel Motor Company, a modern British car company
Ariel Motorcycles, a former manufacturer of motorcycles, bicycles, and cars, including a car of the same name

Ships
Ariel-class gunboat, a class of Royal Navy gunboats
Ariel (clipper), a British clipper ship
Ariel (schooner), a 4-masted schooner built by Matthew Turner
HMS Ariel (1777), a 20-gun sixth rate, captured by the French in 1779 and lent to the Americans as USS Ariel
HMS Ariel (1897), a D-class destroyer
HMS Ariel (1911), an Acheron-class destroyer
ST Ariel, a tugboat
USS Ariel (1777), a 16-gun sloop-of-war, originally the Royal Navy's HMS Ariel
USS Ariel (1813), a schooner launched on Lake Erie
USS Ariel (1862), a schooner captured in the American Civil War and used by the Navy
USS Ariel (AF-22), a passenger and refrigerated cargo liner leased from the United Fruit Company and used from 1942 to 1946

Locomotives
Great Western Railway Broad Gauge 2-2-2, 'Ariel' 1837.
Millwall Extension Railway 'Ariel's Girdle'.

Other uses
Ariel (angel) (Hebrew: אֲרִיאֵל‎, romanized: ʾÁrīʾēl) literally means "lion of God". found primarily in Jewish and Christian mysticism and Apocrypha. 
Ariel (name), a given name (including a list of people and characters with the name)
Ariel (detergent), a fabric care brand
ARIEL, an ESA space mission to study exoplanet atmospheres
The Ariel, a pair of apartment buildings on Broadway, New York City
Ariel programme, a British satellite research programme
Ariel School, an independent school in Ruwa, Zimbabwe
Ariel University, an Israeli university
Operation Ariel, the British military evacuation from western France in World War II
Dorcas gazelle or ariel gazelle
Ariel between Wisdom and Gaiety and Prospero and Ariel, two sculptures by Eric Gill on the facade of the BBC's Broadcasting House in London

See also
Aerial (disambiguation)
Airiel, a band
Ari (lion)
Ari (name)
Arial, a typeface
Arielle (given name)
HMS Ariel, a list of ships of the Royal Navy
USS Ariel, a list of ships of the US Navy